FC Rapid Ghidighici was a Moldovan football club based in Ghidighici, Chişinău, Moldova. They played in the Divizia Naţională, the top division in Moldovan football.

History
During the 2006–07 season of the Divizia A, the club, then known as CSCA Chişinău, won promotion to the Divizia Naţională by coming in third. The newly promoted club then become known as CSCA-Steaua Chişinău. In the summer of 2008, the club merged with an club then known as FC Rapid Ghidighici to create CSCA–Rapid Chişinău. Before the 2011/12 season, they changed their name to FC Rapid Ghidighici. They played until the autumn pause of the 2013/14 season of the First division of Moldova . After that, The Moldovan Football Federation Suspended Rapid Ghidighici from all football activities for 3 years.

Previous names
1992 – foundation as CSA Victoria Cahul
1998 – renamed CSA Victoria Chișinău
2000 – renamed CSA ABV Chișinău
2001 – renamed CSA Buiucani Chișinău
2002 – renamed FCA Victoria Chișinău
2005 – renamed CSCA-Agro Stauceni
2006 – renamed CSCA Chișinău
2007 – renamed CSCA-Steaua Chișinău
2008 – merger with FC Rapid Ghidigici to CSCA-Rapid Chișinău
2011 – renamed FC Rapid Ghidighici

Managers

 Victor Afanasiev (2005–0?)
 Igor Oprea
 Pavlo Irychuk (2006–07)
 Vlad Goian (July 1, 2007 – Dec 31, 2007)
 Pavlo Irychuk (2008)
 Serghei Dubrovin (2008–0?)
 Pavlo Irychuk (200?–09)
 Sergiu Secu (interim) (Aug 25, 2009 – Sept 30, 2009)
 Spiridon Niculescu (2009–10)
 Pavlo Irychuk (2010)
 Sergiu Sârbu (2010)
 Eugen Marcoci (2010)
 Pavlo Irychuk (2010)
 Sergiu Sârbu (2010)
 Petru Efros (2010)
 Serghei Carmanov (2010)
 Pavlo Irychuk (2011)
 Sergiu Secu (July 1, 2011 – March 27, 2012)
 Ionel Ganea (March 26, 2012 – April 15, 2012)
 Pavlo Irychuk (2012)
 Sergiu Secu (interim) (April 19, 2012 – June 30, 2012)
 Iurie Osipenco (April 15, 2012 – Dec 31, 2012)
 Sergiu Secu (Jan 1, 2013 – April 9, 2013)
 Volodymyr Lyuty (April 10, 2013 – Sept 12, 2013)
 Sergiu Secu (Sept 13, 2013 – Oct 20, 2013)

Honours
Divizia A
 Winners (1): 2003–04

Divizia B
 Winners (1): 1993–94

Moldovan Cup
 Runner-up (1): 2011–12

See also
 2009–10 CSCA-Rapid season

External links
 Official website 
 Profile  at weltfussballarchiv.com
 Profile at DiviziaNationala.com 

Football clubs in Moldova
Rapid
Association football clubs established in 1992
Military association football clubs
1992 establishments in Moldova
Association football clubs disestablished in 2014
Defunct football clubs in Moldova